Beithys or Bithyas was a king of the Odrysian kingdom of Thrace, who reigned from c. 140 BC to c. 120 BC. He was the son of Cotys IV.

References

See also
List of Thracian tribes

2nd-century BC rulers in Europe
Odrysian kings